Skudai Highway (Lebuhraya Skudai), also known as Senai Highway (Lebuhraya Senai), Jalan Tun Abdul Razak or Jalan Skudai, Federal Route 1, is a 29 kilometre partial-access highway in Johor, Malaysia, from the town of Senai in Kulai District to Johor Bahru City in Johor Bahru District. The highway is designated as part of Federal Route 1.

History
Opened to traffic in 1985, Skudai Highway was built as an upgrade to the Federal Route 1, as part of the North–South Expressway project. It was built as a four-lane highway (two in each direction). The stretch from Bandar Baru Uda to Skudai was widened to six lanes in 2001 to enable the highway to handle higher traffic capacity.

Skudai Highway used to be a tolled highway with two toll plazas, the Senai toll plaza and the Johor Causeway toll plaza. The highway concession was held by PLUS Expressway Berhad, the concessionaire of the North–South Expressway. In March 2004, the federal government decided to abolish the Senai toll plaza, and maintenance responsibility of the highway was transferred to the Malaysian Public Works Department. The Johor Causeway toll plaza remained in operation until 2008.

Until 2008, the highway was linked to the Johor–Singapore Causeway on its southern end via the former Johor Bahru CIQ Complex. With the opening of the new CIQ complex, Sultan Iskandar Building, access to the Causeway and Singapore is provided by the Eastern Dispersal Link.

The Tampoi North Interchange has been upgraded to a Double U-Turn interchange. Construction began in 2005 and was completed in 2008. Meanwhile, Skudai North junctions between Route 1 and Route 5 has been upgraded to trumpet interchanges. Construction began in 2005 and was completed in August 2007.

List of interchanges and junctions

See also
 Federal route 1
 Johor–Singapore Causeway
 North–South Expressway
 Malaysian Federal Roads system
 Malaysian expressway system

External links
 Plus Expressway Berhad
 Department of Works, Malaysia
 Malaysian Highway Authority

Expressways and highways in Johor
North–South Expressway (Malaysia)